Egidio Morbello (born August 19, 1936 in Balzola) is a retired Italian professional football player.

Honours
 Serie A champion: 1962/63.

External links
Profile at Enciclopediadelcalcio.it

1936 births
Living people
Italian footballers
Serie A players
Serie B players
Casale F.B.C. players
U.S. Alessandria Calcio 1912 players
A.S. Roma players
S.P.A.L. players
Inter Milan players
A.C.R. Messina players

Association football midfielders
People from Balzola
Footballers from Piedmont
Sportspeople from the Province of Alessandria